Chamartaliya, also spelled Chamartalia, is a village in Gosainganj block of Lucknow district, Uttar Pradesh, India. As of 2011, its population is 832, in 155 households.

References 

Villages in Lucknow district